Bahamas competed at the 1984 Summer Paralympics in Stoke Mandeville, Great Britain and New York City, United States. 2 competitors from Bahamas won 2 medals including 1 silver and 1 bronze and finished joint 41st in the medal table with Indonesia.

See also 
 Bahamas at the Paralympics
 Bahamas at the 1984 Summer Olympics

References 

Bahamas at the Paralympics
1984 in Bahamian sport
Nations at the 1984 Summer Paralympics